The Second Coming of Suzanne (also known as Suzanne) is a 1974 American drama film directed by Michael Barry. It stars Jared Martin as an obsessed San Francisco indie film maker who hires a beautiful young woman called Suzanne (played by Sondra Locke) to star as a female Christ in his next film. Paul Sand co-stars as Suzanne's artist boyfriend. Richard Dreyfuss appears as a member of the crew who becomes concerned at the increasingly weird antics of the rest of the ensemble, which culminate in the crucifixion of Suzanne on a local hill. The film was inspired by the lyrics of Leonard Cohen's song "Suzanne", as heard on the soundtrack. The director's father Gene Barry is also featured, as a TV presenter, in a somewhat opaque sub-plot.

This appears to be Michael Barry's only known film as a director. It was shot during July, August and September 1972 in San Francisco and Sausalito. Locations include Sam's Anchor Café, Angel Island and the Lyford House in Tiburon, the Bay Bridge toll plaza, Golden Gate Park and downtown Berkeley.

The film music was recorded by Touch.

See also
 List of American films of 1974

References

1974 films
1974 drama films
American drama films
1970s English-language films
1970s American films